Dearham railway station was on the single track Derwent Branch of the Maryport and Carlisle Railway (M&CR) in the then county of Cumberland, now Cumbria, England.

The station was opened in 1867, situated on the south eastern edge of Dearham village. There was a passing loop and a siding at the station.

Passenger services
All passenger trains along the branch line called at Dearham station.

By June 1876 this pattern continued, with two trains added each way on Sundays between Cockermouth and Bullgill.

It is not clear whether passengers had to change at Bullgill or whether a reversal took place there as well as at Brigham.

In 1914 Sunday trains were withdrawn.

Sources differ when Papcastle closed. One says it lost even its Signal Stop status (by implication, closed) in 1914 whilst another gives its closure date as 1921.

The journey time from Cockermouth to Bullgill averaged 25 minutes.

In 1922 six trains called at the station in each direction, Monday to Saturday, with no Sunday service.

Closure
The service through the station survived until 1935.

Unusually for those times the tracks were lifted not long after closure, with a tragic consequence, when a bridge was being demolished a girder fell on two men and killed them.

Afterlife
By 2013 little trace of the station remained.

See also

 Maryport & Carlisle Railway
 Whitehaven, Cleator and Egremont Railway
 Cleator and Workington Junction Railway
 Cockermouth & Workington Railway
 Dearham Bridge railway station

References

Sources

Further reading

External links
 The station on an Edwardian OS map, via National Library of Scotland
 The station, via Rail Map Online
 The station on the branch, with mileages, via Railway Codes

Disused railway stations in Cumbria
Former Maryport and Carlisle Railway stations
Railway stations in Great Britain opened in 1867
Railway stations in Great Britain closed in 1935
Railway stations in Cumbria
Bridekirk